Tafelsig is a neighbourhood located within the Mitchells Plain urban area of the City of Cape Town in the Western Cape province of South Africa. It is located in the south eastern corner of the Mitchells Plain area. 

Educational institutions in the neighbourhood include: 

 Agape School
 Yellowwood Primary School
 Perseverance Primary School
 Cascade Primary School
 Searidge Park Primary
 Tafelsig Primary School
 Huguenot Primary School
 Mitchell Heights Primary School
 Tafelsig Secondary School
 AZ Berman High School

References 

Suburbs of Cape Town